The Stopped Clock is a 1913 American drama film featuring Harry Carey.

Cast
 Claire McDowell as The Antique Dealer's Daughter
 Charles West as The Senior Clerk (as Charles H. West)
 Reggie Morris as The Junior Clerk
 Kate Bruce as The Mother
 Hector Dion as The Doctor
 Harry Carey as The Detective
 Frank Evans as First Policeman
 Joseph McDermott as Second Policeman
 W. Chrystie Miller as Extra

See also
 Harry Carey filmography

External links

1913 films
1913 drama films
1913 short films
Silent American drama films
American silent short films
American black-and-white films
Films directed by Anthony O'Sullivan
Films with screenplays by Frank E. Woods
1910s American films